Sinjung-dong Station is a railway station on Seoul Subway Line 7.

Station layout

Vicinity
Exit 1 :
Exit 2 :
Exit 3 : Lotte Department Store
Exit 4 :
Exit 5 :
Exit 6 :
Exit 7 :

Railway stations opened in 2012
Seoul Metropolitan Subway stations
Metro stations in Bucheon